Mohamud Mohammed Hassan ( – 9 January 2021), a 24-year old British-Somali man, died on 9 January at his home in Cardiff after being released from police custody earlier that day. Hassan was allegedly assaulted while in the custody of South Wales Police. He was arrested on the evening of 8 January after a disturbance was reported at his home. He was released without charge the following morning.

Hassan was arrested at his home on Newport Road in the Roath district of Cardiff on suspicion of a breach of the peace on Friday 8 January and taken to Cardiff Bay police station. He was released at 8:30 am the following morning, on Saturday 9 January, and officers returned to his home at 22:30 that evening. Hassan's aunt, Zainab Hassan, said that he was released by police "with lots of wounds on his body and lots of bruises...He didn't have these wounds when he was arrested and when he came out of Cardiff Bay police station, he had them". Zainab Hassan had not been present during the incident leading to Mohamud's arrest.

South Wales Police said that there were no indications that excessive force had been used or indications of misconduct by officers. Police described his death as "sudden and unexplained". The police referred his death to the Independent Office for Police Conduct (IPOC). The report from Hassan's post mortem is awaiting completion and toxicology test results are awaited. The police said that as part of their investigation "CCTV and body-worn video has already been, and will continue to be, examined...Early findings by the force indicate no misconduct issues and no excessive force".

Hassan came into contact with 52 police officers in the hours before his death.

IOPC investigation
The Independent Office for Police Conduct investigation will focus on Hassan's arrest, his subsequent journey to custody in a police van and his time spent at Cardiff Bay police station. It will be investigated "whether relevant assessments were made" before his release from custody. The IOPC will interview officers involved in his case and witnesses to his arrest and subsequent movements after his release from custody.

The IOPC director for Wales, Catrin Evans, said that "Preliminary indications are that there is no physical trauma injury to explain a cause of death".

Reactions
The First Minister of Wales Mark Drakeford said that reports of Hassan's death were "deeply concerning and that the circumstances of his death "must be properly investigated" and that "Our thoughts must be with the family of a young man who was... a fit and healthy individual". Referring to the IOPC, Drakeford said that "The first step in any inquiry will have to be to allow them to carry out their work. I absolutely expect that to be done rigorously, and with full and visible independence". The leader of Plaid Cymru, Adam Price, said that "Every effort should be made to seek the truth of what happened".

Hundreds of protestors gathered at Cardiff Bay Police Station to protest his death on 12 January. Signs were held by protestors that read "Black Lives Matter" and the crowd chanted "no justice, no peace". Smokebombs and fireworks were thrown at police by protestors. The protestors demanded the release of CCTV footage of Hassan in custody. More than 150 protestors remained at Cardiff Bay Police Station on successive days.

The lawyers Hillary Brown and Lee Jasper are assisting the Hassan family. The pair had previously helped the family of Christopher Kapessa; his death had failed to be properly investigated by South Wales Police in July 2019.

Dylan Moore wrote in a post for the Institute for Welsh Affairs that the media reporting of Hassan's death represented "the truly alarming weakness of the media...when considering a case like this" as the initial statement from South Wales Police was "regurgitated" and reported by media "unchallenged and without qualification" with "the testimony of eyewitnesses...given secondary or no importance".

Bianca Ali was summoned by court for breaching COVID lockdown rules after allegedly organising a protest against Hassan's death that had more than 30 attendees. Ali is due to pay either a 500 fixed penalty fine or request a court hearing. Ali is one of the founders of Black Lives Matter Cardiff and Vale.

30,000 people had signed a petition in the month that called the IOPC to release documents and CCTV footage detailing Hasan's death.

References

2021 in Wales
2021 deaths
21st century in Cardiff
Deaths by person in Wales
Year of birth uncertain
Law enforcement in Wales
Welsh people of Somali descent